Tony Kouzarides (born 17 January 1958), FMedSci, FRS is a senior group leader Gurdon Institute, a founding non-executive director of Abcam and a Professor of Cancer Biology at the University of Cambridge.

Education
Tony did his PhD at the University of Cambridge and postdoctoral work at MRC Laboratory of Molecular Biology in Cambridge and New York University Medical Center. His research group at the Gurdon Institute is focused on epigenetic modifications and their involvement in cancer.

Research & Activities
Epigenetic modifications and cancer

Do enzymes that modify chromatin and RNA offer therapeutic targets? DNA exists in the cell nucleus wrapped around histone proteins to form chromatin. The DNA and histones are decorated with many types of covalent chemical modifications, which can affect transcription and other cellular processes. In addition, non-coding RNAs that regulate chromatin function can be similarly chemically modified. Our lab is involved in characterising the pathways that mediate and control DNA, RNA and histone modifications. We try to understand the cellular processes they regulate, their mechanism of action and their involvement in cancer. 

Our focus at the moment is modifications of messenger RNA (mRNA) and non-coding RNA. There are very few modifications identified on these low-abundance RNAs, unlike on transfer RNA and ribosomal RNA, where there are many. We have been developing sensitive technologies to detect modifications, such as specific antibodies, chemical reactivity assays and mass spectrometry. Using these, we have been able to detect a number of novel modifications on mRNA and microRNA (short length non-coding RNAs) and have shown that these function to regulate mRNA translation and microRNA processing. Furthermore, we have shown that the enzymes that mediate these modifications are implicated in acute myeloid leukaemia.

Tony Kouzarides is Professor of Cancer Biology at the University of Cambridge and a group leader at the Gurdon Institute. He currently holds the following directorships: Director and Co-founder of the Milner Therapeutics Institute, director of Cambridge Gravity and director of STORM Therapeutics.

Tony is founder/director of Cambridge Gravity, an organization for the promotion of science at the University of Cambridge. He is founder, patron and ex-director of a cancer charity in Spain called Conquer Cancer (Vencer el Cancer). He is on the Scientific Advisory Board of the Institute of Cancer Research (UK) and on the Executive Board of the CRUK Cambridge Cancer Centre.

Tony is a co-founder and ex-director of Abcam plc, a publicly trading research reagents company in Cambridge, a co-founder and ex-director of Chroma Therapeutics, of a drug discovery company based in Oxford and a co-founder and current director of STORM Therapeutics, a drug discovery company based in Cambridge.

Awards & Prizes
Kouzarides has been elected member of the European Molecular Biology Organization, Fellow of the British Academy of Medical Sciences (FMedSci), Fellow of the Royal Society (FRS), Fellow of the American Academy of Arts and Sciences (AAAS) and is a Cancer Research UK Gibb Fellow. He has been awarded the Wellcome Trust medal for research in biochemistry related to medicine (UK), the Tenovus Medal (UK), the Bodossaki Foundation prize in Biology (Greece), the Bijvoet Medal (Holland), the Biochemical Society Award Novartis Medal and Prize (UK) and the Heinrich Wieland Prize (Germany).

References

1958 births
Fellows of the Royal Society
Members of the European Molecular Biology Organization
Academics of the University of Cambridge
English people of Greek descent
Place of birth missing (living people)
Living people
Bijvoet Medal recipients